Res Roma Società Sportiva Dilettantistica a responsabilità limitata, stylized as RES Roma, was an Italian women's football club from Rome. The club last competed in the Serie A in 2017–18. Since 2018 it was replaced by the women section of professional football club A.S. Roma.

History
The clus was founded in 2003 as Res Blu 92. In 2006 it changed their name to A.S.D. Res Roma. In 2013–14 the club reached the Serie A for the first time. In 2015 the club was renamed S.S.D. Res Roma. In the 2016–17 season the club finished highest with a 5th place. After the 2017–18 season the club handed over their Serie A licence to the newly created women's team of A.S. Roma.

Stadiums 
RES Roma played their home games on Unicusano Stadium, on the street Via di Tor Bella Monaca, Rome in 2017–18 season.

See also
 :Category:Res Roma players

References

External links
  
 ASD Res Roma in Soccerway.com, Perform Group.

Women's football clubs in Italy
Association football clubs established in 2003
Football clubs in Rome
2003 establishments in Italy
2018 disestablishments in Italy
Association football clubs disestablished in 2018